Aşağı Xocamsaqlı (also, Ashaghy Khojamsagly, Aşağı Xocamusaxlı and Ashaghy Khojamusakhly) is a village in the Qubadli Rayon of Azerbaijan.

References 

Populated places in Qubadli District